Imbonggun is a village in Minyambaouw district, Pegunungan Arfak Regency in West Papua province, Indonesia. Its population is 103.

Climate
Imbonggun has a subtropical highland climate (Cfb) with heavy rainfall year-round.

References

 Populated places in West Papua